Annamanum plagiatum is a species of beetle in the family Cerambycidae. It was described by Per Olof Christopher Aurivillius in 1913, originally under the genus Orsidis. It is known from Borneo and Malaysia.

References

Annamanum
Beetles described in 1913